Charles Weissmann (born 14 October 1931) is a Hungarian-Swiss molecular biologist. Weissmann is particularly known for the first cloning and expression of interferon and his contributions to the unraveling of the molecular genetics of neurogenerative prion diseases such as scrapie, Creutzfeldt–Jakob disease and "mad cow disease".

Weissmann went to University of Zurich and obtained his MD in 1956 and Ph.D. in Organic Chemistry in 1961. In 1978, Weissmann co-founded the biotech company Biogen in Geneva. Biogen is considered one of the pioneers of the biotechnology industries. Weissmann was director of the Institute for Molecular Biology in Zurich, President of the Roche Research Foundation and co-founder and Member of the Scientific Council of Biogen. He was Chairman of the Department of Infectology, Scripps Florida until 2011.

Weissmann won several awards, including the Otto Warburg Medal (1980) and the Scheele Award (1982). A member of the American Society of Biological Chemistry and the Deutsche Akademie der Naturforscher Leopoldina he is also a Foreign Associate of the U.S. National Academy of Sciences, the Royal Society (UK) and the Pour le Mérite (Germany). On May 16, 2011 Weissmann became Doctor of Science Honoris Causa at New York University.

Awards
Sir Hans Krebs Medal (1974).
Otto Warburg Medal (1980).
Scheele Award (1982).
Wilhelm Exner Medal (1996).
Max Delbrück Medal (1997)
Mendel Medal (1998)

References

External links 
 Profile at The Scripps Research Institute
 "Dart/NYU Biotechnology Achievement Award"

1931 births
Living people
Jewish scientists
Swiss biologists
Scientists from Budapest
Hungarian Jews
Hungarian emigrants to Switzerland
University of Zurich alumni
Foreign Members of the Royal Society
Recipients of the Pour le Mérite (civil class)
Scripps Research faculty
Foreign associates of the National Academy of Sciences
Winners of the Heineken Prize
Fellows of the American Academy of Microbiology